There are two species of skink named Sipora striped skink:

 Lipinia microcerca, found in Vietnam, Cambodia, and Laos
 Lipinia vittigera, native to Myanmar, Thailand, Vietnam, Malaysia, Singapore, and Cambodia

Reptile common names